State Route 508 (SR 508) is a two-lane east-west state highway in the western portion of Ohio, a U.S. state.  The western terminus of State Route 508 is at a signalized intersection with State Route 235 in the village of De Graff.  The route's eastern terminus is at a T-intersection with U.S. Route 68 in West Liberty.

Route description
The entirety of State Route 508 is located within Logan County.  This highway is not incorporated within the National Highway System, a network of highways that are vital to the economy, defense and mobility of the country.

History
First appearing in 1937, State Route 508 occupies the same exact De Graff-to-West Liberty routing today that it did when it was assigned.  No changes have taken place to the routing of State Route 508, other than the fact that the route that it meets at its western terminus was originally State Route 69.  This intersecting route has since been re-designated as State Route 235.

Major intersections

References

External links

 Logan County Highway Map

508
Transportation in Logan County, Ohio